Ballina Coast High School is a government-funded co-educational comprehensive secondary day school, located on Cherry Street, in , in the Northern Rivers region of New South Wales, Australia.

Established in 1956 as Ballina High School, the school enrolled approximately 800 students in 2018, from Year 7 to Year 12, of whom 15 percent identified as Indigenous Australians and eight percent were from a language background other than English. The school is operated by the NSW Department of Education; the principal is Janeen Silcock.

History 
Ballina High School was established in 1956 in Burnett Street, Ballina; as the first high school in Ballina to be opened. In 2013, approximately 470 students were enrolled. In February 2015 it was announced that students in Year 7 to Year 12 at both Ballina High School and Southern Cross K-12 would combine to form the $40 million super school "Ballina Coast High School". New school and community facilities were built on the existing Ballina High School site and completed prior to the 2019 school year. Southern Cross will continue to cater for students in Year K to Year 6 and support units and will be the site for all distance education in Ballina. In 2017 demolition of Ballina High School began and the remaining students in Year 8 to Year 12 were moved to the Southern Cross campus along with the first year  to begin the formation of Ballina Coast High School.

Notable alumni 
Simon Bakeractor
Chris Higginseconomist
Seamus Burke
Kerry Saxby - Olympian,  Australian Champion and World Record Holder.

See also 

 List of government schools in New South Wales
 List of schools in Northern Rivers and Mid North Coast
 Education in Australia

References

External links 
 
 NSW Schools website

Educational institutions established in 1956
1956 establishments in Australia
Ballina, New South Wales
Public high schools in New South Wales